Reynoldsburg High School (RHS) is a public high school located in Reynoldsburg, Ohio, United States, and the only high school in the Reynoldsburg City School District. The school is divided into five academies housed at two separate campuses, each of which has its own academy leaders and administrative team. The athletic teams are known as the Reynoldsburg Raiders, and the school colors are purple and gold. Reynoldsburg High School was established in 1870. The Livingston Campus opened in 1961, followed by the Summit Campus in 2011.

The district, and therefore the high school, serve most of Reynoldsburg and portions of Columbus.

History
The earliest known about RHS is a log cabin that served as the first school in Truro Township around 1819. By 1858, a two-story building was completed on the intersection of Jackson Street and Broadway Drive which housed The Reynoldsburg Union Academy. Organized in 1868 under superintendent Dr. Darlington J. Snyder, the school had 12 grades and graduated its first class of six students in 1871. The two-story brick building was eventually remodeled in 1925 and a third floor was added. The building is now currently Hannah J. Ashton Middle School. Now, RHS has two campuses of high schools, one on Livingston Avenue, which was opened in 1961, the other on Summit Road opened in 2011 when Reynoldsburg redesigned the high school system, using interest-based "academies" for students to get a better learning experience.

State championships

 Girls volleyball - 1989
 Girls track and field - 2009, 2010, 2011, 2012
 Girls basketball- 2022

Notable alumni
 Ashton Dulin, NFL player
 Eric Fryer, professional baseball player in Major League Baseball (MLB)
 Mike Matheny, professional baseball player and manager in MLB
 Roosevelt Nix, professional football player in the National Football League (NFL)

References

External links

High schools in Franklin County, Ohio
Educational institutions established in 1870
Public high schools in Ohio
1870 establishments in Ohio